Kim Sun-min (born 24 May 1964) is a South Korean health care expert currently serving as the President of Health Insurance Review & Assessment Service (HIRA) from April 2020. She is the first woman to lead HIRA since its creation in 2000. Before promoted to its 10th president, Kim was its Executive Director of Planning, its de facto vice-president.

Kim has wealth of experience of working for inter-government and government institutions. She was a senior researcher at Korea Health Industry Development Institute from 1999 to 2001 and human rights researcher at National Human Rights Commission from 2001 to 2004. She took numerous roles in HIRA since 2006 when she was first joined the institution as a member of its Review and Assessment Committee. She also worked as a senior technical officer at World Health Organization's Department of Service Delivery and Safety from 2016 to 2018.

Kim represented HIRA and Korea at OECD Health Care Quality and Outcome (HCQO) Working Group from 2009 and became its chair in 2018 becoming the first Asian-country-national and first woman to lead the HCQO Working Group.

She holds three degrees from Seoul National University - M.D and master's and doctorate in preventative medicine. She was previously an assistant professor at Hallym University and affiliate professor at Catholic University of Korea.

References 

Living people
1964 births
Seoul National University alumni
People from Seoul
South Korean government officials
World Health Organization officials